Andreas Unterberger is an Austrian male curler and curling coach.

Teams

Men's

Mixed

Mixed doubles

Record as a coach of national teams

References

External links

Living people
Austrian male curlers

Austrian curling coaches
Year of birth missing (living people)
Place of birth missing (living people)